Rochin is a surname. Notable people with the surname include:

 Aaron Rochin, American sound engineer
 Refugio Rochin (born 1941), American professor

See also
 Rochin v. California, case decided by the Supreme Court of the United States
 Tinbe-rochin, weapons combination of a short spear (rochin) and a shield (tinbe)